This is a list of the NCAA outdoor champions in the 3000 meters steeplechase.  Hand timing was used until 1973, starting in 1974 fully automatic timing was used.

Champions
Key
y=yards
A=Altitude affected

References

GBR Athletics

External links
NCAA Division I men's outdoor track and field

Steeple NCAA Men's Division I Outdoor Track and Field Championships
Outdoor track, men
Steeplechase